The 2012 Qatar Total Open was a professional women's tennis tournament played on hard courts. It was the 10th edition of the event. It took place at International Tennis and Squash complex in Doha, Qatar between 13 and 19 February 2012. It was upgraded from a Premier event to a Premier 5 event. Victoria Azarenka won the singles title.

Champions

Singles

 Victoria Azarenka defeated  Samantha Stosur, 6–1, 6–2
It was Azarenka's 3rd title of the year and 11th of her career. It was her 1st Premier 5 title of her career and 6th total Premier title. It was her 3rd consecutive title and 17th consecutive match win.

Doubles

 Liezel Huber /  Lisa Raymond defeated  Raquel Kops-Jones /  Abigail Spears, 6–3, 6–1

Singles main-draw entrants

Seeds

1 Rankings as of February 6, 2012

Other entrants
The following players received wildcards into the singles main draw:
 Fatma Al-Nabhani
 Ons Jabeur
 Nadia Lalami

The following players received entry from the qualifying draw:
 Kateryna Bondarenko
 Vera Dushevina
 Caroline Garcia
 Anne Keothavong
 Varvara Lepchenko
 Urszula Radwańska
 Virginie Razzano
 Aleksandra Wozniak

Withdrawals
  Petra Kvitová
  Andrea Petkovic (low back stress fracture)

Retirements
  Marion Bartoli (right calf injury)
  Carla Suárez Navarro (right hip injury)
  Vera Zvonareva (left hip injury)

Doubles main-draw entrants

Seeds

1 Rankings are as of February 6, 2012

Other entrants
The following pair received wildcard into the doubles main draw:
  Fatma Al-Nabhani /  Ons Jabeur

Retirements
  Urszula Radwańska (upper respiratory injury)

External links
Official Website

Qatar Total Open
Qatar Ladies Open
2012 in Qatari sport